Marguerite Thomas Williams (born Marguerite Thomas; December 24, 1895 – August 17, 1991) was an American geologist. She was the first African American to earn a doctorate in geology in the United States.

Early years and education

Marguerite Thomas was the sixth of six children born to Henry C. and Clara E. Thomas. She attended Washington Normal School #2, now known as the University of the District of Columbia. She graduated from the two-year teacher-training program at the University of the District of Columbia (then called Normal School for Colored Girls) in June 1916, with a scholarship to Howard University. Kelly Miller of Howard University delivered the address to the graduates and a song, written by Thomas for the occasion, was sung. She went on to earn a Bachelor of Arts degree from Howard University in 1923 where she was mentored by African American biologist Ernest Everett Just. While earning her Bachelor's degree, Thomas worked as an elementary school teacher. After finishing her degree, she returned to the University of the District of Columbia to teach as an assistant professor and work with the school's theater group.

Thomas was granted a leave from the University of the District of Columbia to pursue her master's degree in geology at Columbia University, which she completed in 1930. After completing her master's degree, Thomas married Otis James Williams, D.D.S., and took his name.

In 1942, she completed her PhD dissertation, The History of Erosion in the Anacostia Drainage Basin, at Catholic University of America in Washington, D.C. This made her the first African American to earn a doctorate in geology in the United States. Her dissertation was later published by the Catholic University of America Press.

Dissertation

In her dissertation, Williams sought to explore the factors that eventually lead to the erosion observed in the Anacostia River. Little had been done in terms of examining the upper and lower regions of the river and the basin sedimentation. The flooding of Bladensburg, Maryland precipitated the erosion and necessitated investigation. She concluded that, in addition to natural erosion, human activities, including deforestation, agriculture and urbanization, accelerated the process.

Career

Williams spent most of her career teaching courses on geology and the social sciences. After gaining her PhD in 1942, she was promoted to full professor at the University of the District of Columbia. For a decade, from 1923 to 1933, she was Chair of the Division of Geography at the University of the District of Columbia. In addition to teaching and serving as chair, she also taught at Howard University during the 1940s. She retired in 1955.

See also
 Timeline of women in science

References

External links
 

1895 births
1991 deaths
20th-century African-American scientists
20th-century American geologists
20th-century American women scientists
African-American women scientists
American women geologists
Catholic University of America alumni
Columbia Graduate School of Arts and Sciences alumni
Howard University alumni
University of the District of Columbia alumni
Scientists from Washington, D.C.
20th-century African-American women